Yangiyoʻl is a district of Tashkent Region in Uzbekistan. The capital lies at the city Yangiyoʻl, itself not part of the district. The district consists of 5 urban-type settlements (Gulbahor, Boʻzsuv, Nov, Kirsadoq, Qovunchi) and 8 rural communities (Yoʻgʻontepa, Halqobod, Xonqoʻrgʻon, Navbahor, Niyozbosh, Qoʻsh yogʻoch, Shoʻralisoy, Eski Qovunchi).

References

Districts of Uzbekistan
Tashkent Region